This is a list of film chronicles produced in Albania during the 1940s.

Film chronicles
  (1947)
  (1948)
  (1948)
  (1948)
  (1949)
  (1949)
  (1949)
  (1949)
  (1949)
  (1949)
  (1949)
  (1949)

References

Lists of Albanian films